The New York City mayoral election of 1973 occurred on Tuesday, November 6, 1973, with the Democratic candidate, New York City Comptroller Abraham Beame winning the mayoralty with a decisive majority amongst a highly divided field.

Beame, a Democrat, also ran on the Civil Service ballot line.

Beame received a decisive 56.49% of the vote citywide. Beame also swept all five boroughs, breaking 60% of the vote in Brooklyn, winning majorities in Queens and the Bronx, and winning with pluralities in Manhattan and Staten Island.

Beame's distant but closest competitor was the Republican nominee, state senator John Marchi, who received 16.07% of the vote.

Finishing in third was the Liberal Party nominee, Assemblyman Albert H. Blumenthal, who received 15.40%.

Finishing in a distant fourth was the Conservative Party nominee, Congressman Mario Biaggi, who received 10.96%.

Beame defeated his nearest competitor by a landslide 40.42% Democratic margin of victory and was sworn into office in January 1974, replacing outgoing Liberal Party Mayor John Lindsay.

Results

note: All the candidates except Marchi had run in the Democratic primary. Candidates votes on their second ballot lines included above were: Beame-Civil Service & Fusion -67,277; Marchi-Integrity - 14,271; Blumenthal - Good Government - 29, 335; Biaggi - Safe City - 8,010. Other vote includes 8,818 Fran Youngstein - Free Libertarian Party; 3,601 Rasheed Storey - Communist; 2,282 Norman Oliver - Socialist Workers; 2,000 Anton Chaiken -Labor; 1,762 John Emanuel - Socialist Labor

See also

References

Mayoral election, 1973
1973
New York City mayoral
New York